Pavel Vadimovich Pankov (born August 14, 1995) is a Russian volleyball player. He is a Master of Sports of international class in Russia.

Personal life
Pankov's father, Vadim Pankov, is a volleyball coach. His mother, Marina Pankova, is a former volleyball player and an Olympic Champion in 1988. Pankov has an older sister, Ekaterina, who is playing for the Russian women's national team.

On 10 June 2017, Pankov married Zarechye-Odintsovo volleyball player Alina Yaroshik.

Sporting achievements
 CEV Cup
  2014/2015 – with Dynamo Moscow
  2020/2021 – with Dynamo Moscow
 National championships
 2011/2012  Russian Championship, with Dynamo Moscow
 2014/2015  Russian Championship, with Dynamo Moscow
 2014/2015  Russian Cup, with Dynamo Moscow
 2015/2016  Russian Championship, with Dynamo Moscow
 2017/2018  Russian Championship, with Zenit Saint Petersburg
 2017/2018  Russian Cup, with Zenit Saint Petersburg
 2020/2021  Russian Cup, with Dynamo Moscow
 2020/2021  Russian Championship, with Dynamo Moscow
 2020/2021  Russian Super Cup, with Dynamo Moscow
 2021/2022  Russian Championship, with Dynamo Moscow
 2021/2022  Russian Super Cup, with Dynamo Moscow

Individual awards
Best setter of the European Youth Championship (2011, 2013)
MVP of the World Youth Championship (2013)
Best server of the European Youth Olympic Festival (2013)
MVP and best server of the Youth European Championship (2014)
MVP of the Youth World Championship (2015)

With teams
Bronze medalist of the European Youth Championships (2011)
World Youth Champion (2013)
Winner of the XII European Youth Olympic Festival (2013)
World Junior Champion (2013, 2015)
European Junior Champion (2014)
Universiade Champion (2015)
World Men's U23 Champion (2015)

References

External links
 FIVB Profile 
 Profile on the Dynamo club page
 Statistics

1995 births
Living people
Sportspeople from Moscow
Russian men's volleyball players
Universiade medalists in volleyball
Universiade gold medalists for Russia
Universiade bronze medalists for Russia
Medalists at the 2015 Summer Universiade
Medalists at the 2019 Summer Universiade
Volleyball players at the 2020 Summer Olympics
Olympic volleyball players of Russia
Medalists at the 2020 Summer Olympics
Olympic silver medalists for the Russian Olympic Committee athletes
Olympic medalists in volleyball
VC Zenit Saint Petersburg players